The Order of Diplomatic Service Merit (Hangul: 수교훈장) is one of South Korea's orders of merit. It is awarded by the President of South Korea for "outstanding meritorious services in the interest of enhancing national prestige and promoting amity with allies." It is a relatively rare honor, being usually awarded to a handful of people every year, and is one of the highest civilian awards of South Korea.

Grades
The Order of Diplomatic Service Merit is divided into 5 grades. The first grade has two classes; the higher class is reserved for the most high-ranking diplomats.

Recipients
David Manker Abshire, former Ambassador to NATO, United States
Georges Arsenijevic, technical advisor, Korean Cultural Center, France
Irina Bokova, Director-General of UNESCO, Bulgaria
Pengiran Muda Mohamed Bolkiah, Prince of Brunei
Pengiran Muda Jefri Bolkiah, Member of the Bruneian Royal Family
Sam Brownback, former US Senator from Kansas, current Governor of the State of Kansas, United States
Fredrick Chien, Director-General of the Government Information Office, R.O.C., Taiwan
Barry Devolin, MP, Canada
Gyanendra, King of Nepal (then Prince of Nepal)
Henrik, Prince Consort of Denmark
Queen Silvia of Sweden
Queen Sonja of Norway
Queen Letizia of Spain
Chaudhry Shujaat Hussain, Prime Minister, Pakistan
Henry Hyde, Congressman, United States
Lee Khoon Choy, MP and Ambassador, Singapore
Darell Leiking, MP and former Minister of International Trade and Industry of Malaysia
Joe Lieberman, Senator, United States
Pin Malakul, Minister of Education and Culture, Thailand
Kamisese Mara, Prime Minister, Fiji
Zoila Martínez, Ambassador to South Korea, Dominican Republic
Alois Mock, Vice Chancellor and Foreign Minister, Austria
Khaldoon Al Mubarak, Chairman of the Executive Affairs Authority, United Arab Emirates
Nguyễn Bá Lương, Speaker of South Vietnam's House of Representatives
Anand Panyarachun, Thailand
Bernhard Paus, humanitarian, Norway
Abu Saleh Mohammad Mustafizur Rahman, MP and Minister of Foreign Affairs, Bangladesh
Lars Løkke Rasmussen, Prime Minister, Denmark
Ryoichi Sasakawa, MP and industrialist, Japan
Edward Seaga, Prime Minister, Jamaica
Vajiralongkorn, King of Thailand (then Crown Prince of Thailand)
Sirindhorn, Princess of Thailand
Pramarn Adireksarn, former Deputy Prime Minister of Thailand
Prem Tinsulanonda, former Prime Minister of Thailand
Venu Srinivasan, industrialist, India
Sergei Stepashin, Prime Minister, Russia
James Van Fleet, Army General, United States
Tengku Intan Zaharah, Queen consort of Malaysia
Ginandjar Kartasasmita, Speaker of the Regional Representative Council of Indonesia 
Thomas Lembong, Minister of Trade of Indonesia 
Abdullah Ahmad Badawi, Prime Minister of Malaysia 
Darell Leiking, Minister of International Trade and Industry of Malaysia 
Hatta Rajasa, Coordinating Ministers for the Economy of Indonesia 
Mahathir Mohamad, Prime Minister of Malaysia
Sudharmono, Vice President of Indonesia
Amb. Anne Höglund, former ambassador of the Kingdom of Sweden.
Park Hang-seo, head coach of the Vietnam national team.
L. B. Moerdani, Commander of the Indonesian National Armed Forces
Pham Binh Minh, Former Deputy Prime Minister of Vietnam
Dato Lim Jock, ASEAN General Secretary
Trần Văn Túy, Chairman of the Vietnam - Korea Parliamentary Friendship Group

See also 
 Orders, decorations, and medals of South Korea

References

External links
 Images of the Order of Service Merit (in Korean with some English)

Orders, decorations, and medals of South Korea
1963 establishments in South Korea
Awards established in 1963
Diplomatic awards and decorations